Michelle Cueni (born 4 December 1983 in Bern) is a Swiss sprinter. She competed for the Swiss team in the 4 × 100 metres relay at the 2012 Summer Olympics; the team placed 13th with a time of 43.54 in Round 1 and did not qualify for the final.

References

1983 births
Living people
Swiss female sprinters
Olympic athletes of Switzerland
Athletes (track and field) at the 2012 Summer Olympics
Sportspeople from Bern
Olympic female sprinters